The highest-selling singles in Australia are ranked in the Australian Recording Industry Association singles chart, also known as the ARIA Charts, published by the Australian Recording Industry Association (ARIA). The data are compiled from a sample that includes music stores, music departments at electronics and department stores and Internet sales, in other words, both digital as well as CD sales.

In January 2020, the Australian Recording Industry Association released a chart with the highest selling singles of the previous decade, using data from all ARIA singles charts between 1 January 2010 and 31 December 2019. Ed Sheeran had the highest-selling single of the decade, "Shape of You", which was certified fourteen times platinum and spent fifteen non-consecutive weeks at number one in 2017. It was followed by "Somebody That I Used to Know" by Gotye featuring Kimbra, the highest-selling Australian single of the decade, which peaked atop the chart for eight weeks in 2011 and was certified eleven times platinum.

Top 100

See also
List of best-selling albums of the 2010s in Australia

References

2010s
Australian record charts
2010s in Australian music